Harry Gould may refer to:
 Harry Gould (footballer), English footballer
 Harry Gould (golfer), Welsh golfer
 Harry Gould (editor), Australian communist and newspaper editor

See also
 Henry Gould (disambiguation)